Prism is a play by Terry Johnson, first performed in 2017,  about the life of Oscar-winning cinematographer Jack Cardiff.

Production 
The play made its world premiere at the Hampstead Theatre, London on 6 September 2017 where it ran until 14 October. The production was directed by Johnson and starred Robert Lindsay as Jack Cardiff and Claire Skinner as Nicola/Katie. It received four-starred reviews in The Independent and in The Guardian, whose reviewer   Michael Billington described Lindsay's performance as "riveting". 

The play is touring the UK from 3 October 2019, opening at the Birmingham Repertory Theatre, with Lindsay reprising the role of Jack Cardiff and Tara Fitzgerald as Nicola/Katie.

Cast

References 

2017 plays
British plays
Plays based on real people